The yellow-rumped antwren (Euchrepomis sharpei) s an insectivorous bird in the antbird family Thamnophilidae. It is endemic to the Yungas (east Andean foothills) of Bolivia (La Paz and Cochabamba) and immediately adjacent Peru (Puno and Cusco).

It is rarely seen but has been recorded at the Cochabamba-Villa Tunari road, Chapare, Cochabamba, in 1979; in the Serranía Bellavista north of Caranavi, La Paz, in 1979-1980 and 1997, although playback surveys at the start of the breeding season in 2005 failed to find it and it may no longer be present there; Cerro Asunta Plata, La Paz in 1993; Rio Paracti, Chapare, Cochabamba in 2000, and between San Juan del Oro and Putina Punco, Puno in 2007. It may have been overlooked to some extent, and it may possibly occur in reasonably high density along the Manu road, where it occurs above its congener T. callinota in the only known area of overlap. A population estimate exceeding 10,000 individuals has been suggested, although the species does appear to be naturally rare and patchily distributed, and playback surveys in several areas of prime habitat have failed to find it. Numbers have almost certainly declined substantially owing to recent deforestation.

The yellow-rumped antwren was described by the German ornithologist Hans von Berlepsch in 1901 and given the binomial name Terenura sharpei. The current genus Euchrepomis was introduced in 2012.

References

External links
BirdLife Species Factsheet.

yellow-rumped antwren
Birds of the Yungas
yellow-rumped antwren
Taxonomy articles created by Polbot